Kenneth Jinghwa Hsu  Ph.D, M.A., born 28 June 1929, is a Chinese scientist, geologist, paleoclimatologist, oceanographer, government advisor, author, inventor and entrepreneur who was born in Nanjing, China.

Biography

Education

Hsu (Prof. Dr. Dr. h.c.) studied at the Chinese National Central University (later renamed Nanjing University in mainland China and reinstated in Taiwan) (B.Sc. 1948), and came to the United States in 1948 where he studied at Ohio State University (M.A., 1950), and at University of California, Los Angeles, where he received his Ph.D in 1953.

Professional life

Hsu initially  worked as a petroleum geologist for the Shell Development Corporation, now called Shell Oil Company, in Houston, Texas, USA, between 1954-1963. He was associate professor at two universities in the USA between 1963–67, before becoming Professor of Geology at the Swiss Federal Institute of Technology (ETH Zürich) between 1967-1994, where he promoted experimental geology and built up 5 leading international laboratories in the fields of rock mechanics (geophysics), mass-spectrometry (isotope geochemistry), Quaternary research (paleoclimatology), sedimentology and tectonics. It was after his retirement from University teaching that Hsu started to work in environmental engineering. 

Professorships & lectureships

While Hsu was professor at the Institute of Geology, ETH Zurich between 1967-94, he was invited as lecturer, guest or honorary professor in geology, climatology or oceanography to numerous renowned universities of the world, including Beijing, California (San Diego), Cambridge, Columbia, Florence, Harvard, London, Milan, M.I.T., Moscow, Nanjing, Naples, Ohio, Oxford, Paris, Princeton, Taipei, Tokyo, Toronto, Washington, Woods Hole, Yale etc.

After retirement in 1994, he was Guest Professor at the National Taiwan University (1994–95), Senior Fellow at the Berlin Institute of Advanced Studies (1995-96), Keck Professor at Colorado School of Mines, Guest Professor at the Hebrew University of Jerusalem, University Professor at Nanjing University, and University Professor at Beijing University of Geosciences.

Scientific contributions

Academic work

Hsu participated in the Earth Science Revolution of the 1960s, consolidating Plate Tectonics Theory, and has throughout his life been active in so-called 'Process Oriented Geology', which is in conversation with the evolutionary biology (symbiogenesis) of Lynn Margulis, the Gaia hypothesis of James Lovelock, and others. Instead of being preoccupied with rocks and mirrors, Hsu treated  geological problems as arising from physical, chemical and biological processes, and hence has been a stout promoter of an educational reform in geology, emphasizing the fundamental principles of earth physics, chemistry and biology.

In geology, his work included sedimentation in isostatically driven tectonic basins, the active margins of continental plates, physical chemistry of evaporite and pelagic diagenesis, documentation of granulite formation, catastrophic consequences of meteorite impacts, extinction of life forms and the limnology of Lake Zurich.

Scientific expeditions and explorations

Hsu participated and led 5 deep-sea drilling cruises to the South Atlantic, Mediterranean, and Black Sea. He also led several international expeditions to Tibet, Xinjiang, Inner Mongolia, South China, California Coast Ranges and the Swiss Alps, travelling to 80 countries for Earth Science.

Awards

For his contributions to geology, Hsu received several medals and awards.

Wollaston Medal from The Geological Society of London (considered the highest honor in Geology, or an equivalent to the Nobel Prize in Geology) in 1984 (formerly presented to Charles Lyell, Thomas Henry Huxley, Charles Darwin and James Lovelock).
Penrose Medal from The Geological Society of America in 2001 (the highest honor by the Society).
President's Special Award, American Association of Petroleum Geologists (resulting in Hsu being listed in Who's Who in Trade & Industry)
Twenhofel Medal from the Society of Sedimentary Geology in 1984 (the highest award of the Society of Sedimentary Geology).
Bownocker Medal (Orton Award), from the Geological Sciences Department of Ohio State University, 1984.

Honorary positions and achievements

Hsu was elected a Member of the U. S. National Academy of Science in 1986, but in given circumstances, became a Foreign Associate. He was also an Associate of the Third-World Academy of Sciences, a Member of Academia Sinica (1988), the Mediterranean Academy of Sciences and several other academies of science. He was a founder of the European Geophysical Society and a founder of the science of paleoceanography. He convened the First International Conference of Paleoceanography and founded the journal Paleoceanography. Hsu also assisted in the founding of the Asian Association of Marine Geology. He also served for 11 years as President of the International Association of Sedimentologists. Hsu was the convener of the Third Workshop on Marine Geology of IUGS; the First Earth Science Colloquium of the European Science Foundation; several Dahlem Conferences of the Dahlem Foundation; and numerous symposia and workshops for IGP, ILP, IGCP, SCOR and JOIDE.

Leadership positions in scientific organizations

Hsu served in numerous scientific organizations:

President and Past President of the International Association of Sedimentologists (IAS);
General Secretary of the Alpine Mediterranean Working Group of the International Geodynamics Project (IGP);
Chairman of the Paleoceaonography Working Group of the International Lithosphere Project (ILP);
Leader of several projects of UNESCO's International Geological Correlation Project (IGCP);
Chairman of the International Commission of Marine Geology (1980–1989);
Chairman of the Committee on Sedimentology of the International Union of Geological Sciences (IUGS);
ex officio member of the Executive Committee of the Scientific Commission on Oceanographic Research (SCOR) (1980–1989);
member of the Swiss Commission on UNESCO (1987–1990);
International Union of the Geological Sciences (IUGS);
Representative of the Geological Sciences at the IGBP/Global Change Program of the International Council of Scientific Unions (ICSU) (1989–1992);
ICSU member of the United Nations Expert Panel on Seabed Disposal of Radioactive Waste (1987–1988);
Chairman of the Mediterranean Panel, South Atlantic Panel and Tectonics Panel of the Joint Oceanographic Institutions Deep Earth Study Program (JOIDES),
Member of the Paleoceanography Panel and the JOIDES Planning Committee of the Ocean-Drilling Program.

Editorships

Hsu was Editor and or Associate Editor of numerous journals including:

Sedimentology: Journal of the International Association of Sedimentologists (Founding Editor & Editor-in-Chief 1972-1979). UK: Blackwell Science.
Journal of Sedimentary Petrography.
Bulletin of the American Association of Petroleum Geologists.
Geophysical Research Letters.
Bulletin of the Japanese Geological Society.
Tethys.
Geologie Mediterrane.

Scientific affiliations

Advisor, Chinese Natural Science Foundation.
Alumni of the Century, Nanjing University (Gold Medal, University Centenary Celebration).
Associate Fellow, Third World Academy of Sciences.
Chair, International Marine Geology Commission, 1980–89.
Chairman, Department of Earth Sciences, Swiss Federal Institute of Technology.
Distinguished Alumnus, Ohio State University.
Emeritus Professor, Swiss Federal Institute of Technology.
First Distinguished Alumni Lecturer of Geology, UCLA.
Guest Professor, National Taiwan University (1994–95).
Guest Professor, Hebrew University of Jerusalem.
Honorary Professor, University College London, April 2008.
International Writer of the Year, International Book Club (Cambridge), 2003.
Keck Professor, Colorado School of Mines.
Member, National Academy of Sciences, Academy Sinica (Taiwan).
Member, Mediterranean Academy of Sciences.
Member & Foreign Associate, U.S. National Academy of Sciences, 1986.
President, International Association of Sedimentologists, 1978–82.
Senior Fellow, Institute of Advanced Studies, Berlin, 1995–96.
University Professor, Nanjing University.
University Professor, Beijing University of Geosciences.

Advisory work

Hsu was a convener of numerous scientific conferences, founder of several scientific societies, and advisor to the governments of developing countries:

UNDP Advisor to Maltese Government (1973);
UNDP Advisor to Chinese Government (1989);
Advisor to Brazil Government on petroleum geology;
Advisor to Argentina and Taiwan governments on lake research and global change;
Advisor to the Chinese Ministry of Geology (1979–87);
Consultant to the Chinese Ministry of Chemical Industry (1992–1996);
Consultant to the Chinese Ministry of Petroleum Geology (1992–94);
Consultant to the Taiwan Museum of Natural History (1995);
Technical Advisor to the Taiwan National Science Foundation (1996–2000);
External Examiner to the University of Malaysia.
Consultant to the Chinese Ministry of Petroleum;
Consultant to the Chinese Ministry of Geology and Mining;
Consultant to the Chinese Institute of Geotechnical Investigation (Ministry of Construction).

Science politics

His co-organized a consortium of 15 European member states to join the International Ocean Drilling Program.

Contributions to the geology of China

Hsu successfully lobbied for the admission of the Chinese Geological Union to replace the Chinese Geological Society in Taipei as a member of the International Union of Geological Sciences and was a member of the first IUGS delegation to China. He served the Chinese Ministry of Geology and Mining in giving training programs for Sedimentology (1979), Field Geology of Tibet (1980) and Plate Tectonics (1992). From 1983–1995, he assisted the Institute of Geology of the Chinese Academy of Sciences with the completion of a project on plate tectonics and to publish a new Geological Atlas of China.

Appreciation

Two Festschrift symposia books, Controversies in Geology, and Paradoxes in Geology, were published by Hsu's colleagues on his 60th and 70th birthdays. In September 2009, his contributions to China and to science were acknowledged at a conference in Beijing, attended by dignitaries from government, industry and academia.

Entrepreneurial activities

Enterprise

After his retirement, Hsu made several inventions in mining, oil, water and energy technology, and founded various companies including Tarim Resource Recycling Limited (UK, 2003); Kenneth Hsu IHC Technology & Development Limited (China, 2005) and Lazarus Energy International Limited (UK, 2007).

Inventions

Hsu was awarded 16 patents in mining, petroleum, water, carbon, energy and environment management, including the Hydro-Transistor and Integrated Hydrologic Circuit (IHC).

Hsu's technologies applied in China  included:
3-D Enhanced Oil Recovery of the world's residual oil reserves;
Lithium Production from brine lakes and sea water to empower hybrid vehicles;
Water Availability by waste water recycling and rainwater harvesting to eliminate shortages;
Nitrite-Free Drinking Water scientifically demonstrated to reduce the cancer mortality rate by half;
Nitrite-Free Sewage-Treatment Works to denitritize the drinking water supply;
Lake Rehabilitation by eliminating algal pollution through sequestering of carbon dioxide;
Biofuel Generation by utilizing carbon dioxide emissions to mitigate the burning of fossil fuels;
Capillary Irrigation to conserve water whilst reclaiming land without utilizing surface irrigation;
Land Reclamation and Desert Greening by sequestering atmospheric carbon dioxide;
Hydro-Electricity without building hydro-electric dams.

Endorsements

After extensive research and development, Hsu's water technologies were unanamiously endorsed by an expert panel called by the Chinese State Counsellors' Office (Civilian Chief of Staff) of the Chinese Prime Minister Wen Jiabao; and by Nobel Laureate Samuel Ting, and University of California Chancellor, Henry Yang, who both served on the Chinese Premiere's KHC Advisory Board.

In 2000, Hsu combined the newly developed enhanced oil recovery techniques of hydro-fracturing and horizontal drilling, with water flooding, to invent a totally new process of residual oil recovery (ROR), called 3-dimensional fluid injection, to exploit residual oil. The method utilized water rather than carbon dioxide, although carbon dioxide can also be used in the process. Hsu suggested the technique could increase the recoverable petroleum reserve of the world by a factor of 50% or more. 

With the full support of the Chinese Prime Minister, Wen Jiabao, in February 2006, an Expert Panel called by former Petroleum Minister Dr Wang Tao, unanimously agreed Hsu's ROR invention was innovative, and should be tested and applied in China. In April 2006, PetroChina reported a successful test at the Changqing Oil Field (Northwest China), first discovered in 1907. Prior to the test, its annual production was about 10,000 tons. In 2006, this rose to 10 million tons, and in 2007, to 20 million tons.

Ventures

Hsu is active with institutions, organizations and corporations to apply the new technologies in China and internationally.

Consultancy

Hsu is President of the IHC Technology & Development Corporation (China), Senior Advisor and Chief Engineer to the Kenneth Hsu Institute for IHC Development (National Institute Of Earth Sciences, Beijing) and Director of the Center for Environmental & Health Engineering (Henan University, Kaifeng). His work on the link between nitrite in drinking water and cancer was documented in The Ecologist journal.

Career timeline

1944-48 Bachelor of Science in Geology, Nanjing University, China.
1948-50 M.A. Degree in Geology, Ohio State University, USA.
1950-53 Doctorate in Geology and Geophysics, University of California at Los Angeles, USA.  
1954-63 Research Geologist & Research Associate, Shell Development Corporation, Houston, Texas, USA.
1963-64 Associate Professor, State University of New York at Binhamton, USA.
1964-67 Associate Professor, University of California at Riverside, USA.
1967-94 Professor, Swiss Federal Institute of Technology (ETHZ), Zurich, Switzerland.
1994 Chief Executive, Tarim Associates for Mineral & Oil Exploration AG, Switzerland.
1999 Chief Executive, Fengshui Water Technology Limited, Lichtenstein.
2003 Chief Executive & Chairman of the Board, Tarim Resource Recycling Limited, UK.
2005 President, Kenneth Hsu Corporation of Integrated Hydrologic Circuit Technology & Development, Beijing, China.
2007 Chief Executive, Lazarus Oil International, UK.
2007 Director, Kenneth Hsu Consulting, UK.
2007 Chief Engineer & Senior Advisor, Institute for IHC Development, National Institute Of Earth Sciences, Beijing, China.
2007 Director, Center for Environmental & Health Engineering, Henan University, Kaifeng, China.

Notable writings

Hsu authored or edited over 20 books, many in multiple languages, and was elected an International Writer of the Year by the International Book Club (Cambridge, UK) in 2003.

The Mediterranean Was A Desert, 1982

The book concerned Hsu's work deciphering the Messinian Salinity Crisis and provided a first-hand account of one of the most significant deep-sea drilling cruises ever launched. The voyage, Leg 13 of the D/V Glomar Challenger, was undertaken in 1970 and led to the hypothesis that 5.5 million years ago, the Mediterranean was a desert. It documented the adventures of the oceanographic expedition and offered portraits of 'big' science and 'big' scientists at work, with human touches, as a memoir for historians of science. The book was selected by Philip Morrison of Scientific American as one of the 100 most significant and influential books of science in the 20th century. A film was also made by PBS, based on the book.

Challenger At Sea, 1983

The book was an overview of the then current state of marine geology and a source book for the history of that science, and was used as a geology textbook for non-majors.

The Great Dying, 1986

The book described the circumstances leading to the discovery that the dinosaur extinction was triggered by a cometary impact. An inquiry into the nature of survival and extinction, it was published in 6 languages, selling over 170,000 copies worldwide, selling 28,000 copies in the United States between 1986 and 1988; 100,000 copies in Mainland China in 1989 and 40,000 copies in Taiwan. A popular newspaper in Taipei United Post featured The Great Dying in its weekly list of best-selling books list for more than a year, and it was chosen as a top non-fiction book of the year in August 1992. Originally intended to teach the public, the book was used as a textbook in the United States for its scientific method. A film was also made based on the book by ZDF.

In the book, Hsu marshalled "some of the most gripping and controversial geological discoveries of our time to blast Darwin’s claim and to shake the foundations of his evolutionary theory," showing evidence indicating a meteor collided with the Earth, 66 million years ago, leaving much of it uninhabitable, and warning that a similar event may threaten humanity in the future.

Hsu criticized Charles Darwin's theory of natural selection. According to Hsu "If most extinctions are caused by catastrophes... then chance, not superiority, presides over who shall live and who shall die. Indeed, the whole course of evolution may be governed by chance, and not reflect at all the slow march from inferior to superior forms so beloved by Victorians, and so deeply embedded in Western thought." The book endorses catastrophism and non-Darwinian evolution.

Klima Macht Geschichte, 2000

Klima Macht Geschichte presented a theory of climate and history, looking at future climate changes based on historical, archaeological and helio-biological evidence. It made the prediction of global cooling of the planet in the last decades of the 21st century, and the coming of a little ice age before 2500. The claim forecast was corroborated by scientists Khabibullo Abdusamatov, Yuk Yung, John Cassey, Nigel Calder, Henrik Svensmark, Alexander Chizhevsky and John D. Hamaker . Orell Fussli Verlag   published the book after an article about Hsu appeared in Bilanz Magazine  in 1998. Earlier, in 1992, Hsu wrote in Geographical Magazine, "Perhaps our species was created by Gaia to prevent a catastrophic chill" in reference to his published paper 'Is Gaia Endothermic?, on which the book is also based.

Amadeus & Magdalena, 2002

Published in Chinese, English and German, with a Chinese translation titled "莫扎特的愛與死"., the book presented Hsu's musicological theory about the death of Wolfgang Amadeus Mozart.

Works
A complete list of books by Kenneth Hsu is available at the Kenneth J. Hsu Official Site.

Amadeus & Magdalena
2002, Amadeus & Magdalena: A Love Story. Distributed through Master Classics (UK). English.
2002, Amadeus & Magdalena: A Love Story. German.
2002, Amadeus & Magdalena: A Love Story. Taipei: Commonwealth Publishers, 218pp. Chinese.

Challenger At Sea
1982, Ein Schiff revolutioniert die Wissenschaft. Hamburg,: Hoffmann & Campe Verlag, 304 pp. German.
1985, Ein Schiff revolutioniert die Wissenschaft, Beijing: Geology Publishing House, 175 pp. German.
1994, Challenger at Sea: A Ship that Revolutionized Earth Science, New Jersey: Princeton University Press, 416 pp. Hardback. English.
1994, Challenger at Sea: A Ship that Revolutionized Earth Science, New Jersey: Princeton University Press, 418 pp. Paperback edition. English.
1994, Challenger at Sea: A Ship that Revolutionized Earth Science, New Jersey: Princeton University Press, 418 pp. Revised edition. English.
1999, Challenger at Sea: A Ship that Revolutionized Earth Science, Tokyo: Tokai University Press, Tokyo, 483 pp. Japanese.

Climate And Peoples
2000, Climate And Peoples: A Theory Of Climate Changes & Their Impacts On Hominid Evolution, Language Dispersal & Demographic Migrations. English.
2000, Klima Macht Geschichte: Menschheitsgeschichte als Abbild der Klimaentwicklung, Zurich: Orell Füssli Verlag, 334 pp. . German. (Climate Makes History: The History Of Mankind As A Reflection Of Climatic Evolution)
2002, Klima nacht Geschichte, Taiwan: Commonwealth Publishers. Chinese.

Gaia & The Cambrian Explosion
1996, Gaia & The Cambrian Explosion: A Short History for Everyone of Life on Earth. Taichung: Chinese National Museum Of Natural History, Taiwan, 51pp. Chinese.
1996, Gaia & The Cambrian Explosion: A Short History for Everyone of Life on Earth. German.

Geologic Atlas Of China
1998, Geologic Atlas of China, Amsterdam: Elsevier, 24 plates, 362 pp. English.
1998, Geologic Atlas of China. Chinese.

Geology Of Switzerland
1991, Geologie der Schweiz, Basel: Birkhouser, 219pp. Hardback. German.
1995, Geology of Switzerland: An Introduction to Tectonic Facies. New Jersey: Princeton University Press, 250 pp. English.

Tectonic Facies Of China
1992, Tectonic Facies of China. China: Marine Geology Research Institute (Qingdao), 96 pp. Chinese.
1996, Tectonic Facies of China. Amsterdam: Elsevier Science. English.
1996, Tectonic Facies of China. German.

The Great Dying
1986, La Gran Extinción, Barcelona: Antoni Bosch Editorial, 268 pp. Spanish.
1986, The Great Dying: Cosmic Catastrophe, Dinosaurs & The Theory of Evolution, San Diego: Random House, Harcourt Brace Jovanovich. Hardback, 292pp. English.
1988, The Great Dying. Dutch.
1989, The Great Dying, China edition, Beijing: San-lien Publishers, 317 pp. Chinese.
1990, Die Letzten Jahre Der Dinosaurier, Germany: Birkhäuser, Basel, 270 pp. German.
1991, The Great Dying, Taiwan edition, Taipei: Commonwealth Publishers, 374 pp. Chinese.
1988, The Great Dying: Cosmic Catastrophe, Dinosaurs & The Theory of Evolution, USA: Random House, Ballantine, Pan. Paperback. English.
1993, La Grande Moria Dei Dinosauri, Milan: Adelphi Edizioni S.P.A., 374 pp. Italian.
1994, The Great Dying, Italian Book Club edition. Italian.

The Mediterranean Was A Desert
1982, The Mediterranean Was a Desert: A Voyage of The Glomar Challenger, New Jersey: Princeton University Press, Hardback. 197pp. English.
1982, The Mediterranean Was a Desert: A Voyage of The Glomar Challenger. German.
1983, The Mediterranean Was a Desert: A Voyage of The Glomar Challenger. Italian.
1986, The Mediterranean Was a Desert: A Voyage of Discovery, Beijing: San-lien Publishers, 215 pp. Chinese.
1987, The Mediterranean Was a Desert: A Voyage of Discovery, China edition, Beijing: Geological Publishing House, 197pp. Chinese.
1987, The Mediterranean Was a Desert: A Voyage of The Glomar Challenger, New Jersey: Princeton University Press, Paperback. English.
1993, The Mediterranean Was a Desert: A Voyage of Discovery, Taiwan, Taipei: Commonwealth Publishers, 260 pp. Chinese.
1996, The Mediterranean Was a Desert: A Voyage of Discovery, New Jersey: Princeton University Press, 197 pp. English.

The Search
1997, The Search: The Younger Years of Kenneth J. Hsu (Aloneness & Search), Taipei: Commonwealth Publishers, 474pp. Chinese.
1997, The Search: The Younger Years of Kenneth J. Hsu (Aloneness & Search). German.
1997, The Search: The Younger Years of Kenneth J. Hsu (Aloneness & Search). Unpublished. English.

Physics of sedimentology: textbook and reference

Selected articles

Hsu is the author or co-author of more than 400 scientific articles on Archaeology, Cancer, Chronon Physics, Climatology, Cosmology, Cytology, Epistemology, Evolution, Fractal Geometry, Gaia, Geology, Heliobiology, History, Hydro-Physics, Languages, Marine Biology, Mathematics, Marine Biology, Music, Oceanography, Palaeontology, Paleoclimatology, Philosophy, Politics, Religion and Symbiogenesis. A complete list of articles by Kenneth Hsu is available at the Kenneth J. Hsu Official Site  .

Climate articles

Climate for the 21st Century and Beyond from a Calibrated Solar-Output Model with Dr. Charles A. Perry (USGS), 2001, in West, G.J., and Buffaloe, L.D., eds., Proceedings of the Seventeenth Annual Pacific Climate Workshop, May 22–25, 2000, Two Harbors, Santa Catalina Island, California: Interagency Ecological Program for the San Francisco Estuary Technical Report 67, p. 120.
Geophysical, Archaeological & Historical Evidence Supports A Solar Model For Climate Change with Dr. Charles A. Perry (United States Geological Survey), Proceedings of the National Academy of Sciences (USA), 2000, Volume 97, pages 12433–438, 2000. English. PNAS Short versionPNAS Long versionPub Med ASCII version
The Mortality Of The Planet in Is the World Ending?, Sean Freyne & Nicholas Lash (Editors), SCM Press (London), 1998. English. Available in English, Spanish, Portuguese, French, Italian, Dutch and German, from Concilium. 
Un Planeta En Peligro De Muerte in Is the World Ending?, Sean Freyne & Nicholas Lash (Editors), SCM Press (London), 1998. English.  Spanish translation in Concilium.
"Sun, Climate, Famine & Great Ethnic Migrations", Science In China/Chinese Science Bulletin. 28 (4): 336–384, 1998. 
"Could Global Warming Be A Blessing For Mankind?", Terrestrial Atmospheric & Oceanic Sciences/TAUS, Chinese Academy of Science, Taipei, Taiwan, September 1996 
Is Gaia Endothermic?, Geological Magazine, 129 (2), pp. 129–141, XIV, March 1992. English. 
Gaia Has A Strange Attractor: Interactions Of Geospheres & Biospheres During 4 Billion Years of Earth History, Unknown
Has Global Warming Been A Blessing To Mankind?, Unknown. Early version of Could Global Warming Be A Blessing For Mankind?.
Gaia & The Cambrian Explosion: A Short History For Everyone Of Life On Earth, Chinese National Museum of Natural History, Taiwan, September 1996.

Science articles
The Dark Side Of Science, Global View Monthly, Commonwealth Publishers, Taipei, Taiwan, 1998.
In Search Of A Common Language, Transfigural Mathematics, Volume 2, Number 1, 1996, pp41–59
In Search Of A Common Language, Arbeitsberichte, Wissenschaftskolleg, Jahbrbuch 1995–1996, pp87–95
In Search Of A Physical Theory Of Time, PNAS. 
Are Chronons the Elementary Particles in Space and Time?, Terrestrial, Atmospheric & Oceanic Sciences, Volume 7, Number 239–255, June 1996. TAO, PO Box 23–59, Taipei, Taiwan, PRC.
Why I Write, Transfigural Mathematics, Volume 1, Number 5, 1996, pp-11-18
Why Isaac Newton Was Not A Chinese, 24 June 1994, Abschiedsvorlesung von Prof. Dr. Kenneth J. Hsu, Auditorium Maximum der ETH Zurich
Fractal Geometry Of A Career in Controversies in Modern Geology: Evolution of Geological Theories in Sedimentology, Earth History & Tectonics, edited by D.W. Müller, J.A. McKenzie, H. Weissert, Academic Press-Harcourt Brace Jovanovich, London, New York, Sydney, 1991.

Evolution articles
Is Darwinism Science? Taoists, Nazis and Gamblers Offer Different Views Of Evolution, Earthwatch Magazine, March 1989, pp15–17.
Catastrophic Extinctions & The Inevitability Of The Improbable, Referat und Diskussion der 28. Sitzung der Studiengruppe Energieperspektiven Baden, 26. Marz 1987, Doukumentation Nr. 28, Studiengruppe Energieperspektiven.
Evolution, Ideology, Darwinism and Science, Klin Wochenschr (1989), 67:923-928, Klinische Wochen-schrift, Springer-Verlag, 1989
Catastrophic Extinctions & The Inevitability Of The Improbable, Journal of the Geological Society, London, Volume 146, 1989, pp749–754, 5 figs. pp749–754
Darwin's Three Mistakes, Geology, Volume 14, p532-534, June, p532-534, June 1996

Geology articles

Lost Secrets Of The Mediterranean: 2000 meters beneath the sea, grand canyons, death valleys and the pillars of Atlantis, The Sciences, USA: The New York Academy of Sciences, pp44–51. Undated.
Environmental Changes in Times of Biotic Crisis, Processes in the History Of Life, Raup & Jablonski, Dahlem Conference 1986, Berlin, pp297–312
When The Mediterranean Dried Up: 6 million years ago, the Mediterranean basin was a desert 10,000 feet deep, Unknown, p25-37, 12 pages
Sedimentary Geology & Biologic Evolution - Reply, Journal of Sedimentary Petrology, Volume 57, Number 4, July 1987, Society of Econoic Paleontologists & Mineralogists
Mountain-building, Elsevier Science, 1996, pp8–11
Acceptance Speech by K. J. Hsu to the Geological Society of America, on the Occasion of an Award of the Penrose Medal,

Music articles
Fractal Geometry of Music: From Birdsong To Bach, with Andres Hsu, USA: Proceedings of the National Academy of Sciences, 87 (1990), 938–941. 
Fractal Geometry Of Music: Physics Of Melody, with Andres Hsu, Proceedings National Academy Of Science, Volume 87, pp938–941, Feb 1990, Physics

Materials citing Hsu

Books

 Streit um heiße Luft: Die Kohlendioxid Debatte, Uwe Schulte,  Hirzel, Stuttgart, 2003. .
 Paradoxes in Modern Geology, Editors: Briegel & Xiao, Amsterdam: Elsevier Science, 2001. 
 Controversies in Modern Geology: Evolution of Geological Theories in Sedimentology, Earth History & Tectonics, edited by D.W. Müller, J.A. McKenzie, H. Weissert, Academic Press-Harcourt Brace Jovanovich, London, New York, Sydney, 1991.

Articles

 An Appreciation of Professor Kenneth Jinghwa Hsu on the Occasion of his 60th Birthday Celebration, Controversies in Modern Geology: Evolution of Geological Theories, in Sedimentology, Earth History & Tectonics, edited by D.W. Müller, J.A. McKenzie, H. Weissert, Academic Press-Harcourt Brace Jovanovich, London, New York, Sydney, 1991.
 Physics Chronon Challenge, Transfigural Mathematics (Berlin, Germany), Volume 2, Number 1, 1996. Interview by Lere O. Shakunle pp 67–73.
 Je Pense Que Je Suis Un Genie, P. Imper & M. Schlapfer, Bilanz Magazine, Switzerland (French edition), pp 44, 4 pages, 1998.
 Ich denke, ich bin ein Genie, Bilanz Magazine, Switzerland (German edition), pp 154, 5 pages, November 1997
 Chance in a Collison with Darwinism, Lee Dembart, Los Angeles Times, 1980s
Mediterranean desert, Christopher Wren, and industrial chemistry, Philip Morrison (MIT), Scientific American, 1987
 The Mediterranean Was A Desert, International Oceanographic Foundation, 5 September 1987
 Below the Bottom, C. Vita-Finzi, Times Literary Supplement, 27 April 1984
 Homo sapiens: a temporary warming trend?, Ptolemy, Geographical Magazine, August 1992, pp58
 Love that Pleistocene!, Ptolemy, Geographical Magazine, February 1993, pp50
The Mediterranean Was A Desert, Geology, September 1984

Films

The Mediterranean Was A Desert, BBC. Producer: David Attenborough.
The Mediterranean Was A Desert, PBS, 45 minutes. Producer: Madeline Peck. Director: Philip Morisson.
The Mediterranean Was A Desert, ZDF, Producer: Hoimar Von Ditfurth.
The Great Dying, PBS. Producer: Madeline Peck. Director: Philip Morisson.
The Great Dying, ZDF, Producer: Hoimar Von Ditfurth.
Landsliding: The Mountain, BBC Horizon.
Landsliding: The Mountain Slide, BBC Horizon.
Climate And Tibet, BBC Horizon. Producer: Walter Suche.

Other writings
1970	Development of the Northern Apennines Geosyncline, ed. by G. Sestini, Palaoegeography, Palaeoclimatol, Palaeocol., 11, (1972), pp. 72–74, XIV
1973	Atlas of Palaeobiogeography, ed. by Anthony Hallam, Sedimentology (1973), v. 20, Aug. 1973, pp. 453–454, XIII
1974	Marine Evaporites, Origin, Diagenesis and Geochemistry, ed. by D.W. Kirkland, et al. Sedimentology, v. 21, no. 3, Aug. 1974, pp. 486–487, XIII.
1977	International Stratigraphic Guide, ed. by H.D. Hedberg, et al., Sedimentology (1977), v. 24, pp. 597–598, XIII.
1978	Sedimentary Rocks, by F.J. Petitjohn - Sedimentary Petrology, Part II, by H. Füchtbauer - Sediment Petrologie, Teil II, by H. Füchtbauer & G. Müller - Origin of Sedimentary Rocks, by H. Blatt, et al. Sedimentology (1978), 25, pp. 149–152, XIII
1978	The Evolution of North America, by Ph. B. King - Studies in Palaeo-Oceanography, by W.W. Hay - Palaeographic Provinces and Provinciality, by Ch. A. Ross - Tectonics and Sedimentation, by W.R. Dickinson Sedimentology, v. 25, no. 5, Oct. 1978, pp. 732–735, XIII.
1979	Sorby on Geology, ed. by Ch. Summerson, Sedimentology, v. 26, no. 6, Dec. 1979, pp. 873–875, XIII.
1981	The Geological Evolution of the River Nile, by R. Said, Springer 1981, 151 pp. 73 figs., in Die Naturwissenschaften, Heidelberg, Nawi BB577.
1983	Sedimentary Petrology, by H. Blatt, Sedimentology, v. 30, no. 4, Aug. 1983, pp. 586–587, XIII.
1985	Memoirs of an Unrepentant Field Geologist, by P.J. Pettijohn, Sedimentology (1985), 32, pp. 615–616, XIII
1985	Geological Evolution of the Mediterranean Basin, by D.J. Stanley & F.C. Wezel, Springer Verlag, 1985, 589 pp., XIII.
1985	The Caledonide Orogon-Scandinavia and Related Area: ed. D.G. Gee & B.A. Sturt, Chichester, 1985 (John Wiley & Son), XIII
1987	The Ocean of Truth, by H.W. Menard, Geochimica et Cosmochimica, v. 51, pp. 2045–2046, 1987, USA, XIII.
1988	The Geology of China, by Yang Zunyi et al., Geology, Jan. 1988, XIII
1990	The Origin of Species Revisited : The Theories of Evolution and of Abrupt Appearance (2 v.); by W.R. Bird. New York 1989 (Philosophical Library). American Journal of Science, Vol. 290, November 1990, No. 9, p. 1090-1092. XIV
1991	Scientist of Empire, by Robert A. Stafford, Cambridge University Press, Cambridge and New York, 1989, 293 p. in GSA Today, Vol. 1, No. 2, Feb. 1991, p. 40, 41, 43. XIV
1993	The Tancheng-Lujiang Wrench Fault System, Xu Jiawei, John Wiley & Sons, Chichester, U.K., 1993, XV + 279 pp.

Notable lectures 
In Search Of A Common Language: What Does Modern Physics Have In Common With Traditional Chinese Medicine?, The Ashby Lecture, 15 March 2000, Clare Hall College, Cambridge University, UK.
Nitrite Pollution & Cancer, Queen Mary College, University of London, 15 February 2008. In association with CSSA UK.
Residual Oil Exploitation for Stable Economy and Transition, School of Oriental & African Studies, University of London, 23 January 2009. In association with CSSA UK.
The Kenneth J. Hsu Oil & Water Press Conference, Geological Society, 15 October 2008, Geological Society of London, UK. In association with CSSA UK.

See also 
List of ETH Zurich people

References

External links
Kenneth J. Hsu Official Site 
Charles A. Perry - List of online Papers
Perry & Hsu - List of online Papers

1929 births
Living people
20th-century Chinese geologists
Chinese climatologists
Chinese science writers
20th-century Swiss geologists
Swiss non-fiction writers
Swiss male writers
National Central University alumni
Nanjing University alumni
Ohio State University alumni
Penrose Medal winners
Wollaston Medal winners
Sustainability advocates
Independent scientists
Non-fiction environmental writers
Members of Academia Sinica
Foreign associates of the National Academy of Sciences
Writers from Nanjing
State University of New York faculty
University of California faculty
Academic staff of ETH Zurich
Businesspeople from Nanjing
Catastrophism
Non-Darwinian evolution
Paleoclimatologists
Chinese oceanographers
Scientists from Nanjing
Symbiogenesis researchers
University of California, Los Angeles alumni
UCLA Department of Earth Planetary and Space Sciences alumni
Male non-fiction writers